Eye of a Hurricane is the sixth studio album by American country music artist John Anderson. It was released in June 1984. It produced singles in  its title track, "She Sure Got Away with My Heart", and "I Wish I Could Write You a Song". It was re-released in 2007.

Track listing

Chart performance

Weekly charts

Year-end charts

Singles

References

1984 albums
Warner Records albums
John Anderson (musician) albums